Flavio Briatore (born 12 April 1950) is an Italian businessman. He started his career as a restaurant manager and insurance salesman in Italy. Briatore was convicted in Italy on several fraud charges in the 1980s, receiving two prison sentences, though the convictions were later extinguished by an amnesty. Briatore set up a number of successful Benetton franchises as a fugitive in the Virgin Islands and the United States.  In 1990, he was promoted by Luciano Benetton to manage the Benetton Formula One racing team, which became Renault F1 in 2002.  From 2007 to 2011, he was part-owner and chairman of London's Queens Park Rangers F.C. In September 2009, Briatore was forced to resign from the ING Renault F1 team due to his involvement in race fixing at the 2008 Singapore Grand Prix.  After the Fédération Internationale de l'Automobile (FIA) conducted its own investigation, Briatore was banned indefinitely from any events sanctioned by the FIA, although this ban was later overturned by a French Tribunal de Grande Instance.

Early life and Benetton career 
Briatore was born in Verzuolo near Cuneo in the Maritime Alps to a family of elementary school teachers. After twice failing public (state) school, he attended a private (independent) school, receiving a diploma with the lowest grades in Land Surveying at Fassino di Busca high school. Briatore found early work as a ski instructor and restaurant manager. He opened a restaurant named Tribüla, which was Briatore's nickname. The restaurant was unsuccessful and had to close due to excessive debt.

In the 1970s, he moved to Cuneo and became an assistant to businessman Attilio Dutto, owner of the Paramatti Vernici paint company. Dutto was killed on 21 March 1979 in a car bomb attack by an unknown perpetrator.

Briatore moved to Milan and worked for Finanziaria Generale Italia at the Italian stock exchange. During this period, he met Luciano Benetton, founder of the Benetton clothing company.

Convictions and fugitive status 
Briatore was convicted of multiple counts of fraud in the 1980s, receiving two prison sentences. In 1984, a court in Bergamo found him guilty of various counts of fraud and he was fined and sentenced to one year and six months in prison. The sentence was subsequently reduced to one year by a court of appeal in 1988. In 1986, in Milan, Briatore was sentenced to three years for fraud and conspiracy for his role in a team of confidence tricksters who, over a number of years, set up rigged gambling games using fake playing cards. The judges described these as elaborate confidence tricks, in which victims were invited to dinner and then "ensnared" in rigged games that involved a cast of fictional characters and realised enormous profits for their perpetrators. After an appeal in 1987, the sentence was reduced to one year and two months. To avoid imprisonment, Briatore lived as a fugitive in Saint Thomas, Virgin Islands. He never went to prison and returned to the EU after both convictions were extinguished by amnesty. In 2010, a Turin court ordered Briatore rehabilitated, which by Italian Criminal Code results in the extinction "of any criminal effect of the conviction".

During Briatore's fugitive status, he maintained close relations with Benetton and opened some Benetton stores in the Virgin Islands. When Benetton opened his first five stores in the United States in 1979, he appointed Briatore as director of the group's American operations. Thanks to Benetton's methods of franchising, the chain experienced a brief boom in popularity in the US, where, by 1989, there were 800 Benetton stores. Briatore, having taken a cut of each franchising agreement, became very wealthy. As store owners began to complain of competition from other Benetton stores, the number of stores decreased to 200 and Briatore began to look for a new business. In 1999, the Corriere della Sera wrongfully reported that he had been arrested in Nairobi on suspicion of fraud relating to real estate in Kenya, but further to a libel claim brought by Briatore against the newspaper, this allegation proved to be untrue and Briatore was compensated.

Formula One

Benetton Formula

Luciano Benetton appointed him commercial director of his Formula One team, Benetton Formula Ltd. (formerly Toleman), and when he fired the team management shortly thereafter, Briatore was promoted to managing director and set about turning Benetton into a competitive team.

The Benetton team won the World Constructors' Championship in 1995.

In 1994 Briatore rejected Umberto Agnelli's proposal to move to Ferrari.

During the  season, Briatore's Benetton team came under allegations of cheating, resulting in fines and a two-race ban for Schumacher.

He passed operational management of Ligier to Tom Walkinshaw and took on complete management of Benetton.

In , Benetton replaced Briatore with David Richards.

Renault F1

In 2000, Renault announced its plans to return to Formula One with the purchase of the Benetton Formula team. Briatore returned as managing director and team principal, replacing Rocco Benetton. The team raced as Benetton-Renault in 2001 before becoming Renault F1 in 2002.

Briatore has a reputation as a talent-scout and probably his greatest 'find' has been Fernando Alonso. Briatore met with the teenage Spaniard in 1999. As his manager, Briatore secured him a race drive with Minardi in 2001 and promoted him to test-driver for Renault in 2002.

In 2003, Briatore fired race-driver Jenson Button and replaced him with Alonso. When he replaced Button the outcry was huge but Briatore stated, "time will tell if I am wrong".

With Alonso, Renault won both the driver's and constructor's championships in 2005 and 2006. However, Alonso turned his back on Briatore to sign for rivals McLaren for 2007.

Briatore also acted as manager for Mark Webber, Jarno Trulli, Nelson Piquet Jr. and Heikki Kovalainen. Despite winning the 2004 Monaco Grand Prix, Trulli was dropped from Renault by Briatore and replaced by Giancarlo Fisichella.

In April 2006, Renault F1's new president Alain Dassas stated that having a contract with Briatore for 2007 was 'a key factor' in securing the company's commitment to the sport, "and we will do everything to ensure Flavio stays". Briatore was duly confirmed on 6 September 2006 as staying at Renault for the 2007 and 2008 seasons.

Briatore replaced Alonso with Kovalainen for 2007, saying "with Kovalainen, I hope to find the anti-Alonso".

Allegations were made during November 2007 by the FIA against the Renault F1 team regarding information they were found to have in their possession concerning the 2006 and 2007 McLaren F1 cars. These allegations were the subject of an FIA investigation, with an FIA hearing taking place on 6 December 2007. Renault were found guilty of breaching the same regulation as McLaren (see F1 espionage scandal), but were not punished. Despite this guilty verdict, Briatore hit back at McLaren's Ron Dennis, saying "here is a team that acquired an advantage illegally. Just read the regulations: for intellectual property theft the punishment is exclusion... Ron Dennis… was the one who protested us on the mass damper. He is not the immaculate saint he pretends to be on his statements".

In August 2009, Briatore was heavily criticised by Nelson Piquet Jr., the son of three-time F1 champion Nelson Piquet, after Piquet Jr. was removed from the Renault team. On his personal website, Piquet Jr. called Briatore his "executioner". In an interview with Autosport magazine, Piquet Jr. said that Briatore "is ignorant about Formula 1". Piquet Jr. criticised Briatore for his ego and for his poor sense of race tactics.

Departure

Briatore resigned as team principal of Renault due to a race fixing scandal. The controversy centred on an early crash involving Nelson Piquet Jr.'s car during the 2008 Singapore Grand Prix of 28 September 2008, when he was still driving for Renault. At the time, Piquet Jr. described the crash as a simple mistake; however, shortly after his acrimonious departure from Renault and criticism of Briatore nearly a year later in August 2009, allegations surfaced that he had deliberately crashed to help Renault teammate Fernando Alonso, who went on to win the race. After a Fédération Internationale de l'Automobile (FIA) investigation, on 4 September 2009 Renault were charged with conspiracy and race fixing, and were due to face the FIA World Motor Sport Council in Paris on 21 September 2009. In return for immunity from punishment, Piquet Jr. had reportedly stated to the FIA that he had been asked to crash by Briatore and Renault chief engineer Pat Symonds. On 11 September, following leaks of Piquet Jr.'s evidence, Renault and Briatore stated they would take legal action against Piquet Jr. for making false allegations. However, five days later, Renault announced they would not contest the charges and that Briatore and Symonds had left the team. The day after the Renault announcement, Renault confirmed Briatore had resigned from the team, while Briatore himself stated of his departure that "I was just trying to save the team", "It's my duty. That's the reason I've finished." The team issued the following official statement:

At the same hearing, the FIA banned Briatore from FIA-sanctioned events indefinitely. The FIA also stated that it would not renew any superlicence granted to Briatore-managed drivers, effectively barring him from managing drivers who participate in any competition that is under the FIA's authority. The FIA stated that it was coming down hard on Briatore because he denied his involvement despite overwhelming evidence and that Renault's actions were serious enough to merit being thrown out of F1. However, since Renault took swift action by forcing Briatore and Symonds to resign once the affair came to light, the FIA effectively placed the team on two years' probation. If Renault committed a comparable offence between 2009 and 2011, it was to be indefinitely banned from F1. British newspaper The Daily Mirror described the ban as the harshest sanction ever imposed on an individual in the history of motorsport.

Briatore later said he was "distraught" at the FIA's action and sued the FIA in French courts to clear his name. On 5 January 2010, the Tribunal de Grande Instance overturned the ban and granted him €15,000 in compensation. The tribunal declared in particular that "the decision of the World Council was presided over by the FIA president, who was well known to be in conflict with Briatore, with Mr Mosley having played a leading role in launching the inquiry and its investigation in violation of the principle of separation of the power of the bodies". The FIA announced that it would appeal the decision issued by the French court, but the two parties reached an out-of-court settlement the following April.

In an interview with Gazzetta dello Sport, Briatore said that he is sure that he will not return to Formula One, despite having his ban overturned.

Stance on the future of F1
Briatore has always spoken out about his desires to see F1 provide better entertainment. In 1994, he said: "All the team owners are orientated towards the technical side rather than the entertainment side, and this is a big fault. Every meeting that I go to, people are talking about pistons and suspensions. Nobody goes to a race to see that kind of thing… People come to see Schumacher and Senna racing each other."

Twelve years later his feelings were much the same: "The people in charge should be businessmen, as they are in Hollywood, not ex-engineers. Nothing costs more, and delivers less entertainment, than hidden technology. And that’s what engineers love most of all."

In 2007, he even went so far as to suggest that Grands Prix be split into two separate races as in the GP2 series.

On 20 March 2014 he said it was wrong to let the car manufacturers succeed in their push for the all-new regulations, featuring 'greener' engines that use less fuel. "They delegated the writing of rules to engineers who do not care about the fans or entertainment, If Formula One does not change again in the near future, then the audience will be lost. Look at the comments on the internet, in blogs, on Twitter – they did not like the Australian Grand Prix. It was an indecipherable and depressing show. This is unacceptable and now we have chaos" said Briatore.

On 12 June 2014 he said: "I do not like this new Formula One. It's not our Formula 1." "He pointed a finger at cars that "do not make a noise", drivers having to "save fuel" and "fake overtaking". He added: "It is no longer a sport of gladiators, it is a sport of accountants."

Business interests
Briatore has developed a diverse portfolio of business interests outside Formula 1, many of which revolve around fashion.

He created the  brand in 1998 and owns a club in Sardinia; in August 2012, he opened another Billionaire club in Marbella under that name along with an haute couture line, Billionaire Italian Couture. In addition to that, he opened Cipriani's restaurant in Mayfair, London, in 2004 and until 2007 owned 48.9% of the pharmaceuticals company . He also operates a Tuscan beach club and Lion in the Sun, a holiday resort in Kenya.

Briatore is a beneficiary of Autumn Sailing Ltd, which purchased the super yacht Force Blue from Home Shopping Network investor Roy Speer for £68.2m. She was given a refitted interior designed by Celeste dell'Anna and a blue exterior. The yacht was then chartered by a number of individuals including Briatore, who named it as the most extravagant present he had ever bought himself. In 2010, the yacht was seized by officers investigating a tax fraud over its charter status and VAT on fuel. The Italian Supreme Court ruled that there were no issues with the seizure, though the yacht itself was released

Queens Park Rangers Football Club
In 2007 Briatore was linked to a takeover of English Championship football club Queens Park Rangers (QPR) from a Monaco-based consortium led by Gianni Paladini. On 1 September 2007 it was officially announced that Briatore (along with Bernie Ecclestone and Lakshmi Mittal) had bought the club. On 7 November 2007, Briatore completed his takeover of QPR together with Ecclestone.  He served as the club's chairman.

In December 2007, Briatore and Ecclestone were joined as co-owners of QPR by multi-billionaire Lakshmi Mittal, who bought 20% of the club.

Following Briatore's ban from FIA, the Football League requested that FIA provide details of its investigation.  The Football League could force Briatore out of QPR under rules that stipulate a club owner must be a "fit and proper person".  The Football League also has the power to ban owners who have been banned from another sporting organisation. The Football League board discussed the matter on 8 October 2009 and declared that they would be awaiting a response from Briatore to various questions before commenting further. It was announced that he had stepped down from the post effective 19 February 2010.

When interviewed about the QPR experience at an Italian chat show he stated "I will never invest in a Football Club again, it's only ever a good idea if you're very rich and looking for ways to waste your money. In two years you'll be very poor and won't have that problem anymore"

Personal life 
In 1998, he became engaged to supermodel Naomi Campbell; they were involved in an on-again-off-again relationship until their separation in 2003. Campbell now considers Briatore her "mentor".

In March 2003, Briatore began dating supermodel Heidi Klum. In December she announced her pregnancy. Soon after, the two split and Klum began dating the musician Seal. Klum gave birth to Leni Klum in May 2004 in New York City. According to Klum, Briatore is not involved in Leni's life; she has stated emphatically that "Seal is Leni's father". In 2009, Briatore allowed Seal to adopt his daughter and change her name.

Briatore married the 'Wonderbra' model Elisabetta Gregoraci on 14 June 2008. Gregoraci gave birth to their son in Nice, France in 2010.

In 2019 Briatore founded the political party Movimento del Fare.

On 25 August 2020, Briatore was hospitalized after testing positive for COVID-19.

See also
 The Apprentice (Italian TV series)

References

External links 

 

1950 births
Living people
Formula One team owners
Formula One team principals
People from Verzuolo
Queens Park Rangers F.C. directors and chairmen
Renault people
Italian fraudsters
Fugitives wanted on fraud charges
Italian expatriates in the United Kingdom
Italian emigrants to the United Kingdom
Italian sports agents
Italian motorsport people
Motorsport agents
Benetton Formula
People named in the Pandora Papers